The St. Charles Parish Public School System is a public school district headquartered in Luling, Louisiana. It serves all of St. Charles Parish.

Schools
Note: There are no incorporated places in St. Charles Parish. The communities listed in italics after each school are unincorporated census-designated places (CDPs).

High schools

Grades 9-12
Destrehan High School, Destrehan High School website, (Destrehan)
Hahnville High School, Hahnville High School website, (Boutte)

Middle schools
Grades 6-8
Harry M. Hurst Middle School (Destrehan)
J.B. Martin Middle School (Paradis)
Albert Cammon Middle School (St. Rose)
R.K. Smith Middle School (Luling)

Elementary schools
Prekindergarten-Second (2nd) Grade
Allemands Elementary School (1471 WPA Road Allemands, LA 70030) 
Mimosa Park Elementary School (222 Birch Street Luling, LA 70070) 
New Sarpy Elementary School (130 Plantation Road Destrehan, LA 70047) 
Third (3rd) Grade-Fifth (5th) Grade
Lakewood Elementary School (501 E.Heather Drive Luling, LA 70070) 
RJ Vial Elementary School (510 Louisiana Street Paradis, LA 70080) 
Ethel A. Shoeffner Elementary School (140 Plantation Road Destrehan, LA 70047) 
Prekindergarten-Fifth (5th) Grade
Luling Elementary School (904 Sugarhouse Road Luling, LA 70070) 
Norco Elementary School (102 Fifth Street Norco, LA 70079) 
St. Rose Elementary School (230 Pirate Drive St. Rose, LA 70087)

Other Campuses
Satellite Center (285 Judge Edward Dufresne Parkway, Luling, LA 70070)
Dr. Rodney R. Lafon Performing Arts Center (275 Judge Edward Dufresne Parkway, Luling, LA 70070)
Eual J. Landry, Sr. Alternative Center
Professional Learning Center 
Head Start Centers

Former schools

High Schools
Destrehan High School (original campus) - The original main building was damaged by fire and demolished. A head start center uses former high school buildings on the site and Harry Hurst Middle School is also located on the property and uses the former high school gymnasium.
G.W. Carver High School - Served black students on the West Bank. Now the site of a head start center operated by the parish. 
Closed in 1969 due to desegregation: High school students moved to Hahnville High School
Hahnville High School (original campus) - The original building was demolished and Eual J. Landry Alternative Center sits on the former site. The alternative center continues to use the old cafeteria and gymnasium from the original high school.
Mary M. Bethune High School - Served black students on the East Bank.
Closed in 1969 due to desegregation: High school students moved to Destrehan High School and elementary school students went to various schools

Lower Schools
A.A. Songy Kindergarten Center - Luling, Kindergarten center formerly located on the campus of Lakewood Elementary School.
Allemands Elementary (original campus) - Des Allemands
Ama School - Ama
Bayou Gauche School - Bayou Gauche
Boutte Elementary School - Boutte
Comardelle Village School - Comardelle Village
Destrehan Jr. High School - Destrehan. Renamed Harry M. Hurst Middle School. 
Eual J. Landry Sr. Middle School - Hahnville, Eual J. Landry Sr. Alternative Center is now located there.
Good Hope Elementary/Good Hope Primary School - Good Hope
Hahnville Colored School - Hahnville
Hahnville Elementary School - Hahnville
Hahnville Jr. High School - Hahnville. Renamed Eual J. Landry Sr. Middle School. 
Killona Elementary - Killona
Killona School - Killona
Montz School - Montz
New Sarpy Kindergarten Center - New Sarpy, Located on the campus of New Sarpy Elementary School after kindergarten center and elementary school merger.
New Sarpy School - Middle school in New Sarpy
Paradis Colored School - Paradis
Paradis Consolidated School/Youngs School - Paradis
Paradis Elementary School - Paradis
Pecan Grove Elementary School - Destrehan
Rosenwald School - School for black students in Killona
St. Rose Elementary School (back school) - St. Rose, Renamed Albert Cammon Middle School.
St. Rose Primary School (front school) - St. Rose, Renamed St. Rose Elementary School.
St. Rose School - Elementary school in St. Rose

Demographics
Total Students (as of October 1, 2007): 9,639
Gender
Male: 52%
Female: 48%
Race/Ethnicity
White: 58.84%
African American: 36.39%
Hispanic: 3.38%
Asian: 1.06%
Native American: 0.32%
Socio-Economic Indicators
At-Risk: 45.12%
Free Lunch: 35.73%
Reduced Lunch: 9.39%

See also

List of school districts in Louisiana

References

External links
St. Charles Parish Public School System - Official site.

School districts in Louisiana
Education in St. Charles Parish, Louisiana